Commerce station is a Metrolink rail station in the city of Commerce, California.  It is served by Metrolink's Orange County Line running from Los Angeles Union Station to Oceanside. The Metrolink 91 Line from Los Angeles Union Station to Riverside shares the track with the Orange County Line however, no 91 Line trains actually serve the Commerce station. On weekdays, this station is served by eight Orange County Line trains, four in the peak direction of travel during the two peak periods each weekday.  There is no midday, reverse-peak, or weekend service to this station.

History
Commerce opened on July 28, 1993, as in infill station for Amtrak's Orange County Commuter and some San Diegan trains. The Orange County Commuter became Metrolink's Orange County Line when that line opened on March 28, 1994. Amtrak service ended in October 1998.

References

External links 

Metrolink stations in Los Angeles County, California
Commerce, California
Railway stations in the United States opened in 1993
Former Amtrak stations in California